Preben Jensen (born 31 July 1944) is a Danish sprint canoeist who competed in the mid-1960s. At the 1964 Summer Olympics in Tokyo, he finished ninth in the K-2 1000 m event.

References
Sports-reference.com profile

External links

1944 births
Canoeists at the 1964 Summer Olympics
Danish male canoeists
Living people
Olympic canoeists of Denmark
Place of birth missing (living people)